Tilia cordata, the small-leaved lime or small-leaved linden, is a species of tree in the family Malvaceae, native to much of Europe. Other common names include little-leaf or littleleaf linden, or traditionally in South East England, pry or pry tree. Its range extends from Britain through mainland Europe to the Caucasus and western Asia. In the south of its range it is restricted to high elevations.

Description

The largest known trunk circumference was a specimen in Närke, Sweden, that measured 8.35 meters diameter at chest height. Lindar in Germany is said to be over 1000 years old. The bark is smooth and grayish when young, firm with vertical ridges and horizontal fissures when older. The crown is rounded in a formal oval shape to pyramidal. Branching is upright and increases in density with age. The leaves are alternately arranged, rounded to triangular-ovate, 3–8 cm long and broad, mostly hairless (unlike the related Tilia platyphyllos) except for small tufts of brown hair in the leaf vein axils – the leaves are distinctively heart-shaped. The buds are alternate, pointed egg shaped and have red scales. It has no terminal bud. The small yellow-green hermaphrodite flowers are produced in clusters of five to eleven in early summer with a leafy yellow-green subtending bract, have a rich, heavy scent; the trees are much visited by bees to the erect flowers which are held above the bract; this flower arrangement is distinctly different from that of the Common Lime Tilia × europaea where the flowers are held beneath the bract. The fruit is a dry nut-like drupe 6–7 mm long by 4 mm broad containing one, or sometimes two, brown seeds (infertile fruits are globose), downy at first becoming smooth at maturity, and (unlike T. platyphyllos and also T. × europaea) not ribbed but very thin and easily cracked open.

Ecology
The trees favour good, loamy sites, but can also be found on sandy, infertile soils, and are not thought to be drought resistant. Dormant shoots of Tilia cordata can resist winter frost temperatures as low as −34 °C.

In Britain Tilia cordata, traditionally called pry, is considered an indicator of ancient woodland, and is becoming increasingly rare. Owing to its rarity, a number of woods have been given SSSI status. Cocklode Wood, part of the Bardney Limewoods, is the best surviving spread of medieval small leaved limes in England. Another site is Shrawley Wood in Worcestershire. Small-leaved lime was once regarded as holy and good for carving.

Trees in northern England were found to have established when the climate was warmer and have adapted to the cooling climate. Paleobotanical analysis of tree pollen preserved in peat deposits demonstrates that Tilia cordata was present as a woodland tree in the southern Lake District c 3100 B.C. In spite of the late migration of T. cordata into the Lake District, pollen diagrams from many sites show rapid expansion so that, within a few centuries, it had become plentiful and even locally dominant in the southern valleys.  Maximum values for Tilia from all pollen diagrams available for the north of England show a conspicuous concentration of high values in the southern Lake District.  At several sites among the limestone hills on both sides of the estuary of the River Kent, the curves for Tilia, although beginning about 4800 to 4000 B.C. then achieve values of at least 10% within a few centuries. At Witherslack values of this magnitude persist for a depth of 3 m which represents about 4000 years.  For much of this period Ulmus is approximately 10%, Quercus 20%  and the remaining arboreal pollen is largely that of Alnus.  For a shorter period Tilia exceeds Quercus and reaches a maximum of 30%.  The (Witherslack) basin is about 200 m in width, so that with distance correction factors applied this indicates that the surrounding woodlands on well-drained soils contained Tilia, Quercus and Ulmus in the proportions 4 : 1 : 1. Modern mature woodland trees were estimated to have germinated between 1150 and 1300 AD, making them around 800 years old. Precise age determination is impossible as heartwood at the centre disintegrates and therefore rings cannot be counted, and other methods are used.

Pests and diseases
The tree is fairly disease-resistant, though a common problem is leaf scorch where planted on dry soils, however leaf scorch is not a long-term problem as the leaves are lost in the autumn. Pests include Japanese beetles, aphids, lace bugs and various species of moths, such as Lymantria dispar dispar (Gypsy moth). This moth is one of the top 100 invasive species in North America, introduced by Étienne Léopold Trouvelot, and citizens are encouraged to remove Gypsy moth egg masses and cocoons from tree bark in order to help prevent the spread of this species.

Cultivation and uses

Tilia cordata is widely grown as an ornamental tree. It was much planted to form avenues in 17th and early 18th century landscape planning. A famous example is Unter den Linden in Berlin. It is also widely cultivated in North America as a substitute for the native Tilia americana (American linden or basswood) which has a larger leaf, coarser in texture; there it has been renamed "Little-leaf Linden". It is popular as both a shade tree with its dense canopy, an ornamental tree with its architectural shape and a street tree. In the US, Tilia cordata has been planted in Wellesley, MA; Modesto, CA; Chicago, IL; Indianapolis, IN; and Atlanta, GA as street trees. In Europe, there are espaliered trees owing to the ability to survive heavy pruning. Tilia cordata is an easy tree to train for bonsai when the training is not done all at once. Letting the tree recoup in between sessions over a period of several months creates a healthy, good-looking miniature tree.  Prior to the advent of firearms, it was also commonly used for making shields (as referenced in Beowulf).

Tilia cordata survives best in a soil pH range of 5.0 to 8.0. and in USDA Hardiness Zones 3–7.  The tree prefers moist, well drained soil, but can survive flooding; it is not highly drought tolerant. It does not do well in soils with high salinity.

Notable trees
The Najevnik linden tree, about 700 years old Tilia cordata, is the thickest tree in Slovenia. It is a place of cultural events, and every June a national meeting of Slovene politicians takes place under it.

Hybrids
Common lime: T. cordata readily hybridises with Tilia platyphyllos; the hybrid is commonly known as common lime, Tilia × europaea (syn. T. × vulgaris).

Cultivars
'Corinthian' ('Corzam') – dense, uniform limb spacing creates a compact, pyramidal, formal shape; darker and smaller leaves; resistant to Japanese beetles.   
'Greenspire' – the most common, a cross between the cultivar 'Euclid' and a selection from the Boston Parks, broadly used as a street tree, survives better under difficult conditions, overall a good looking, quick growing tree. 
'June Bride' – significantly pyramidal habit, evenly spaced branches around a very straight central leader, glossier leaves, and 3 to 4 times as many flowers. 
'Winter Orange' – rich red-orange-brown stems with reddish buds, can be cut back to grow long shoot extensions. It has gained the Royal Horticultural Society’s Award of Garden Merit.

Linden flower tea

  In the countries of Central, Southern and Western Europe, linden flowers are a traditional herbal remedy made into an herbal tea called lime tea or linden tea in Britain, tilleul in France.

Honey
A monofloral honey is produced by bees using the trees and is widely used all over Europe. "Linden honey" is said to be nutritious and to have medicinal qualities.

Leaves 
The young leaves can be eaten as a salad vegetable. Often cattle graze upon them.

Linden wood
The white, finely-grained wood is not a structurally strong material but a classic choice for refined woodcarvings such as those by Grinling Gibbons for medieval altarpieces, such as the Altar of Veit Stoss. Linden wood was the prime choice for the carvings in St. Paul's Cathedral, Windsor Castle, and Chatsworth. It is also commonly used for lightweight projects such as carved spoons, light furniture, bee hives and honeycomb frames.

Cultural significance

Tilia cordata is the national tree of the Czech Republic and the Slovak Republic, and one of two national trees in Latvia.
The leaf of Tilia cordata is also considered a national symbol of Slovenia.

References

External links

Tilia cordata – distribution map, genetic conservation units and related resources. European Forest Genetic Resources Programme (EUFORGEN)

cordata
Flora of Azerbaijan
Flora of Denmark
Flora of Norway
Flora of Great Britain
Flora of Germany
Flora of Estonia
Flora of Romania
Flora of Latvia
Flora of Lithuania
Flora of Italy
Flora of Turkey
Flora of Spain
Flora of Ukraine
Trees of Europe
Flora of France
Herbal tea
Taxa named by Philip Miller